This is a list of the largest urban agglomerations in Africa. Figures are from the United Nations World Urbanization Prospects report, as well as from citypopulation.de. Figures for administrative areas are also given.

{| class="wikitable sortable"
|-
! City
! Country
! data-sort-type="number" | Administrative areaaccording to local national census authorities
! data-sort-type="number" | Urban agglomerationsUnited Nations - 2020
! data-sort-type="number" | Urban agglomerationscitypopulation.de - 2023
! class="unsortable" | Image
|-
|Lagos
| 
|data-sort-value=13400000| 13,400,000 (2007)
| 14,368,000
| 21,400,000
| 
|-
|Cairo
| 
|data-sort-value=9539673| 9,539,673 (2017) Governorate
| 20,901,000
| 22,200,000
| 
|-
|Kinshasa
| 
| data-sort-value="6901382" |5,528,000 (1998) Province (Kinshasa)
| 14,342,000
| 15,000,000
| 
|-
|Algiers
|
|data-sort-value=3915811|2,988,145 (2008)Wilaya
|2,768,000
|4,175,000
| 
|-
|Casablanca
| 
|data-sort-value=3359818|3,359,818 (2015)
|3,752,000
|4,700,000
| 
|-
|Brazzaville
|
| data-sort-value=1373382| 1,373,382 (2007) Capital District (Brazzaville)
| 2,388,000
| 2,200,000
|
|-
|Johannesburg
| 
| data-sort=value=4434827|4,434,827 (2011)
| 5,783,000
| 14,800,000
| 
|-
|Dar es Salaam
| 
|data-sort-value=4364541|4,364,541 (2012)
|6,702,000
|6,000,000
| 
|-
|Abidjan
| 
|data-sort-value=4210200| 4,210,200 (2002)Département
| 5,203,000
| 6,550,000
| 
|-
|Khartoum-Omdurman
| 
| data-sort-value=2919773|2,919,773 (1993)3 principal cities of the Khartoum agglomeration
| 5,829,000
| 6,850,000
| 
|-
|Alexandria
|
|data-sort-value=4110015| 4,110,015 (2006)Governorate
|5,281,000
|6,100,000
| 
|-
|Nairobi
|
|data-sort-value=3138295| 4,397,023 (2019)Nairobi administrative area
|6,547,547
|6,550,000
| 
|-
|Cape Town
|
|data-sor-value=3497097}| 3,497,097 (2007)Metropolitan municipality
| 4,618,000
| 4,450,000
| 
|-
|Kano
|
|data-sort-value=2153225|2,153,225 (2006)6 local government areas of Kano proper
|3,999,000
|5,200,000
|
|-
|Dakar
|
|data-sort-value=2452656|2,452,656 (2005)Région
|3,140,000
|4,200,000
| 
|-
|Addis Ababa
|
|data-sort-value=2738248|2,738,248 (2007)Astedader
|4,794,000
|4,600,000
| 
|-
|Ibadan
|
|data-sort-value=1338659|2,559,853
|3,552,000
|3,925,000
|
|-
|Douala
|
|data-sort-value=1514978|1,514,978 (2001)Wouri département
|3,663,000
|3,650,000
| 
|-
|Durban
|
|data-sort-value=3468086|3,468,086 (2007)Metropolitan municipality
|3,158,000
|3,575,000
| 
|-
|Ouagadougou
|
|data-sort-value=1475223|1,475,223 (2006)Municipality
|2,780,000
|2,800,000
| 
|-
|Antananarivo
|
|data-sort-value=1000000|
|3,369,000
|2,950,000
| 
|-
|Accra
|
|data-sort-value=1659136|2,076,546 (2010)District (Accra Metropolitan Area) 
|2,514,000
|6,350,000
| 
|-
|Luanda
|
|data-sort-value=1823282|1,823,282 (2002)Provincia
|8,330,000
|9,000,000
| 
|-
|Bamako
|
|data-sort-value=1215335|1,215,335 (2005)District
|2,618,000
|3,975,000
| 
|-
|Abuja
|
|data-sort-value=1405201|1,405,201 (2006)Federal Capital Territory
|3,278,000
|4,100,000
| 
|-
|Port Harcourt
|
|data-sort-value=541116|541,116 (2006)Local government area
|3,020,000
|2,600,000
| 
|-
|Kumasi
|
|data-sort-value=1171311|2,035,000 (2010)  District (Kumasi Metropolitan Area)
|3,348,000
|2,850,000
| 
|-
|Lusaka
|
|data-sort-value=1742979|1,742,979
|2,774,000
|2,250,000
| 
|-
|Mogadishu
|
|data-sort-value=2855800| 3,000,000 (2011)
| 2,282,000
| 2,125,000
| 
|-
|Pretoria
|
|data-sort-value=2345908|2,345,908 (2007)Metropolitan municipality
|2,566,000
|see Greater Johannesburg
| 
|-
|Lubumbashi
|
|data-sort-value=1000000|
|2,478,000
|2,650,000
| 
|-
|Mbuji-Mayi
|
|data-sort-value=1000000|
|2,525,000
|2,325,000
| 
|-
|Tunis
|
|data-sort-value=911643|911,643 (2005)Municipality
|2,365,000
|2,775,000
| 
|-
|Rabat
|
|627,932 (2004)Préfecture
|1,885,000
|2,125,000
| 
|-
|Conakry
|
|1,092,936 (1996)Région
|1,938,000
|2,775,000
| 
|-
|Kampala
|
|1,337,900 (2005)District
|3,298,000
|3,975,000
| 
|-
|Harare
|
|1,903,510 (2002)Province
|1,530,000
|2,600,000
| 
|-
|Benin City
|
|data-sort-value=750000|
|1,727,000
|1,790,000
| 
|-
|Huambo
|
|data-sort-value=630000|
|671,000
|Not listed
| 
|-
|Monrovia
|
|1,010,970 (2008)Municipality
|1,517,000
|1,770,000
| 
|-
|Ndjamena
|
|
|1,423,000
|1,810,000
| 
|-
|Kigali
|
|data-sort-value=620000|
|1,132,000
|1,330,000
| 
|-
|Maputo
|
|1,099,102 (2007)Province-level city
|1,110,000
|2,450,000
| 
|-
|Bujumbura
|
|1,126,930 (2019)
|1,013,000
|not listed

|-
|Fès
|
|977,946 (2004)Préfecture
|1,224,000
|1,330,000
| 
|-
|Kananga
|
|data-sort-value=558000|
|1,458,000
|1,290,000
| 
|-
|Vereeniging
|
|800,819 (2007)District municipality
|774,000
|see Greater Johannesburg
| 
|-
|Marrakech
|
|data-sort-value=560000|
|1,003,000
|1,160,000
| 
|-
|Tripoli
|
|1,126,000 (2006)Mutsarfiyah
|1,165,000
|1,770,000
| 
|-
|Onitsha
|
|data-sort-value=550000|
|1,415,000
|1,310,000
| 
|-
|Mombasa
|
|data-sort-value=550000|
|1,296,000
|1,320,000
| 
|-
|Niamey
|
|2,100,000 (2013)Province
|1,292,000
|1,430,000
|
|-
|Kaduna
|
|760,084 (2006)2 local government areas of Kaduna
|1,113,000
|2,050,000
| 
|-
|Kisangani
|
|data-sort-value=500000|
|1,261,000
|1,220,000
| 
|-
|Hargeisa
|
|data-sort-value=1000000|
|not listed
|not listed
| 
|-
|Freetown
||1,055,964 (2015)Western Area province
|1,202,000
|1,340,000
|
|-
|Oran
|
|
|899,000
|1,570,000
|
|-
|Nouakchott
|
|
|1,315,000
|1,350,000
|
|-
|Maiduguri
|
|
|786,000
|1,340,000
|
|-
|Agadir
|
|
|924,000
|1,280,000
|
|-
|Bangui
|
|
|889,000
|1,560,000
|
|-
|Pointe-Noire
|
|
|1,214,000
|1,140,000
|
|-
|Bosaso
|
|
| not listed
| not listed
| 
|}

See also
 Lists of cities in Africa, mostly by country
 List of cities in Africa by population
   '''

References

External links
 Geopolis

Africa
Africa
 Largest
Populous cities in Africa, List of most
Cities in Africa